is a Japanese anime television series consisting of 26 episodes. It was followed by Shin Don Chuck Monogatari. It was directed by Kazuyuki Okaseko and Kouzo Takagaki and  first broadcast on Tokyo Channel 12 in 1975.

References

External links 
 

1975 anime television series debuts
TV Tokyo original programming
Fictional beavers
Knack Productions